Romang may refer to:

 Romang (island), an Indonesian island
 Romang language, a Malayo-Polynesian language spoken on Romang island
 Romang, Santa Fe, a municipality in Argentina

People 
Martin Romang, Swiss curler

See also 
 Romange, a commune in the Jura department in the region of Franche-Comté in eastern France